The 2009 Formula Palmer Audi season was the twelfth Formula Palmer Audi season. It began on May 2 at Brands Hatch and finished on October 18 at Snetterton. It consisted of twenty rounds all held in England. The championship was won by Richard Plant in his third FPA season.

In a new incentive for 2009, the winner of this season's championship received a £50,000 scholarship prize towards a Formula Two drive, and the top three all received a F2 test.

Driver lineup

Race calendar and results
 All races held in the United Kingdom.

Championship standings

References

External links
Official Formula Palmer Audi Website

Formula Palmer Audi
Formula Palmer Audi seasons
Palmer Audi